Free Men is a 2011 French war drama film written and directed by Ismaël Ferroukhi, which recounts the largely untold story about the role that Algerian and other Muslims from the Maghreb in Paris played in the French Resistance and as rescuers of Jews during the German occupation (1940–1944).

It features two historic figures: Si Kaddour Benghabrit, rector of the Grand Mosque of Paris, and Salim Halali, an Algerian Jewish singer. The film stars Tahar Rahim playing a fictional young Algerian and Michael Lonsdale as the rector.

Plot 
In occupied Paris, the young unemployed Algerian, Younes Ben Daoud, makes a living on the black market. He is arrested by the police, and to avoid prison he agrees to spy on the Paris Mosque. The police suspect that the mosque leadership, including its rector Si Kaddour Benghabrit, is helping resistance fighters and protecting North African Jews by giving them Muslim birth certificates.

While at the mosque, Younes meets the Algerian singer Salim Halali. They become close friends. When Younes learns that Salim is Jewish and sees the work that the people of the mosque are doing, he stops collaborating with the police. The mosque has extended its hospitality to shelter European Jews seeking refuge in Paris and at risk during roundups by the Nazis. He becomes involved with Algerians who are part of the French Resistance, and who are also preparing for their own fight for independence from French colonialism after the war. Gradually he becomes transformed from being a politically ignorant immigrant into a fully fledged resistance fighter.

Main cast 
 Tahar Rahim as Younes Ben Daoud
 Michael Lonsdale as Si Kaddour Benghabrit
 Mahmoud Shalaby as Salim Halali
 Lubna Azabal as Warda Shlimane, alias Leïla
 Christopher Buchholz as Major von Ratibor
 Farid Larbi (fr) as Ali
 Stéphane Rideau as Francis
 Slimane Dazi as Larbi
 Bruno Fleury (fr) as The Inspector
 François Delaive (fr) as Head of Gestapo

Release 
The film premiered at the 2011 Cannes Film Festival on 19 May 2011, and was released in France and Belgium on 28 September 2011. The film saw a limited (4 screens) US release on 16 March 2012, and a wider (14 screens) UK release on 25 May 2012.

Historical review 

Although the singer Selim (Simon) Halali was indeed saved through the issuance of "Muslim" papers, there is no record to support the fact that there was a resistance network within the mosque. Historians Michel Renard and Daniel Lefeuvre also noted in the film several historical approximations, such as the judicial status of Algerians during the colonial era.

Critical response 
The performance of Rahim, who starred in A Prophet (2009), was praised by critics in this film.

In February 2013, 28 film critics gave the film an average rating of 75% on Rotten Tomatoes, while 531 users gave it an average rating of 61%.

The film won the Radio-Canada Audience Award at the 2012 edition of the Cinéfranco film festival.

References

External links 
 
 Press kit about Free Men, Film Movement Canada

2011 films
2010s French-language films
French World War II films
Films set in Paris
2011 war drama films
Films about the French Resistance
Films about immigration to Europe
Films about Islam
Films about Jews and Judaism
French war drama films
2011 drama films
Algeria in fiction
2010s French films